A spa is a location where mineral-rich spring water (and sometimes seawater) is used to give medicinal baths. Spa towns or spa resorts (including hot springs resorts) typically offer various health treatments, which are also known as balneotherapy. The belief in the curative powers of mineral waters goes back to prehistoric times. Such practices have been popular worldwide, but are especially widespread in Europe and Japan. Day spas and medspas are also quite popular, and offer various personal care treatments.

Origins of the term

The term is derived from the name of the town of Spa, Belgium, whose name is known from Roman times, when the location was called Aquae Spadanae, sometimes incorrectly connected to the Latin word spargere meaning to scatter, sprinkle or moisten.

Since medieval times, illnesses caused by iron deficiency were treated by drinking chalybeate (iron-bearing) spring water (in 1326, the iron-master Collin le Loup claimed a cure, when the spring was called Espa, a Walloon word for "fountain").

In 16th-century England, the old Roman ideas of medicinal bathing were revived at towns like Bath (not the source of the word bath), and in 1596 William Slingsby who had been to the Belgian town (which he called Spaw) discovered a chalybeate spring in Yorkshire. He built an enclosed well at what became known as Harrogate, the first resort in England for drinking medicinal waters, then in 1596 Dr. Timothy Bright after discovering a second well called the resort The English Spaw, beginning the use of the word Spa as a generic description.

It is commonly claimed, in a commercial context, that the word is an acronym of various Latin phrases, such as salus per aquam or sanitas per aquam, meaning "health through water". This is very unlikely: the derivation does not appear before the early 21st century and is probably a backronym as there is no evidence of acronyms passing into the language before the 20th century; nor does it match the known Roman name for the location.

History

Spa therapies have existed since the classical times when taking bath with water was considered as a popular means to treat illnesses. The practice of traveling to hot or cold springs in hopes of effecting a cure of some ailment dates back to prehistoric times. Archaeological investigations near hot springs in France and Czech Republic revealed Bronze Age weapons and offerings. In Great Britain, ancient legend credited early Celtic kings with the discovery of the hot springs in Bath, England.

Many people around the world believed that bathing in a particular spring, well, or river resulted in physical and spiritual purification. Forms of ritual purification existed among the Native Americans, Babylonians, Egyptians, Greeks, and Romans. Today, ritual purification through water can be found in the religious ceremonies of Jews, Muslims, Christians, Buddhists, and Hindus. These ceremonies reflect the ancient belief in the healing and purifying properties of water. Complex bathing rituals were also practiced in ancient Egypt, in prehistoric cities of the Indus Valley, and in Aegean civilizations.  Most often these ancient people did little building construction around the water, and what they did construct was very temporary in nature.

Bathing in Greek and Roman times

Some of the earliest descriptions of western bathing practices came from Greece. The Greeks began bathing regimens that formed the foundation for modern spa procedures. These Aegean people utilized small bathtubs, wash basins, and foot baths for personal cleanliness. The earliest such findings are the baths in the palace complex at Knossos, Crete, and the luxurious alabaster bathtubs excavated in Akrotiri, Santorini; both date from the mid-2nd millennium BC. They established public baths and showers within their gymnasium complexes for relaxation and personal hygiene. Greek mythology specified that certain natural springs or tidal pools were blessed by the gods to cure disease. Around these sacred pools, Greeks established bathing facilities for those desiring healing. Supplicants left offerings to the gods for healing at these sites and bathed themselves in hopes of a cure. The Spartans developed a primitive vapor bath. At Serangeum, an early Greek balneum (bathhouse, loosely translated), bathing chambers were cut into the hillside from which the hot springs issued. A series of niches cut into the rock above the chambers held bathers' clothing. One of the bathing chambers had a decorative mosaic floor depicting a driver and chariot pulled by four horses, a woman followed by two dogs, and a dolphin below. Thus, the early Greeks used the natural features, but expanded them and added their own amenities, such as decorations and shelves. During later Greek civilization, bathhouses were often built in conjunction with athletic fields.

The Romans emulated many of the Greek bathing practices. Romans surpassed the Greeks in the size and complexity of their baths. This came about by many factors: the larger size and population of Roman cities, the availability of running water following the building of aqueducts, and the invention of cement, which made building large edifices easier, safer, and cheaper. As in Greece, the Roman bath became a focal center for social and recreational activity. As the Roman Empire expanded, the idea of the public bath spread to all parts of the Mediterranean and into regions of Europe and North Africa. With the construction of the aqueducts, the Romans had enough water not only for domestic, agricultural, and industrial uses, but also for their leisurely pursuits. The aqueducts provided water that was later heated for use in the baths. Today, the extent of the Roman bath is revealed at ruins and in archaeological excavations in Europe, Africa, and the Middle East.

The Romans also developed baths in their colonies, taking advantage of the natural hot springs occurring in Europe to construct baths at Aix and Vichy in France, Bath and Buxton in England, Aachen and Wiesbaden in Germany, Baden, Austria, and Aquincum in Hungary, among other locations. These baths became centers for recreational and social activities in Roman communities. Libraries, lecture halls, gymnasiums, and formal gardens became part of some bath complexes. In addition, the Romans used the hot thermal waters to relieve their suffering from rheumatism, arthritis, and overindulgence in food and drink. The decline of the Roman Empire in the west, beginning in AD 337 after the death of Emperor Constantine, resulted in Roman legions abandoning their outlying provinces and leaving the baths to be taken over by the local population or destroyed.

Thus, the Romans elevated bathing to a fine art, and their bathhouses physically reflected these advancements. The Roman bath, for instance, included a far more complex ritual than a simple immersion or sweating procedure. The various parts of the bathing ritual — undressing, bathing, sweating, receiving a massage, and resting — required separated rooms which the Romans built to accommodate those functions. The segregation of the sexes and the additions of diversions not directly related to bathing also had direct impacts on the shape and form of bathhouses. The elaborate Roman bathing ritual and its resultant architecture served as precedents for later European and American bathing facilities. Formal garden spaces and opulent architectural arrangement equal to those of the Romans reappeared in Europe by the end of the 18th century. Major American spas followed suit a century later.

Bathing in medieval times

With the decline of the Roman Empire, the public baths often became places of licentious behavior, and such use was responsible for the spread rather than the cure of diseases. A general belief developed among the European populace was that frequent bathing promoted disease and sickness. Medieval church authorities encouraged this belief and made every effort to close down public baths. Ecclesiastical officials believed that public bathing created an environment open to immorality and disease. Roman Catholic Church officials even banned public bathing in an unsuccessful effort to halt syphilis epidemics from sweeping Europe. Overall, this period represented a time of decline for public bathing.

People continued to seek out a few select hot and cold springs, believed to be holy wells, to cure various ailments. In an age of religious fervor, the benefits of the water were attributed to God or one of the saints. In 1326, Collin le Loup, an iron-master from Liège, Belgium, discovered the chalybeate springs of Spa, Belgium. Around these springs, a famous health resort eventually grew and the term "spa" came to refer to any health resort located near natural springs. During this period, individual springs became associated with the specific ailment that they could allegedly benefit.

Great bathhouses were built in Byzantine centers such as Constantinople and Antioch, and the popes allocated to the Romans bathing through diaconia, or private Lateran baths, or even a myriad of monastic bath houses functioning in eighth and ninth centuries. The Popes maintained their baths in their residences, and bath houses including hot baths incorporated into Christian Church buildings or those of monasteries, which known as "charity baths" because they served both the clerics and needy poor people. The Church also built public bathing facilities that were separate for both sexes near monasteries and pilgrimage sites; also, the popes situated baths within church basilicas and monasteries since the early Middle Ages. Catholic religious orders of the Augustinians' and Benedictines' rules contained ritual purification, and inspired by Benedict of Nursia encouragement for the practice of therapeutic bathing; Benedictine monks played a role in the development and promotion of spa. Protestantism also played a prominent role in the development of the British spas.

Bathing procedures during this period varied greatly. By the 16th century, physicians at Karlsbad, Bohemia, prescribed that the mineral water be taken internally as well as externally. Patients periodically bathed in warm water for up to 10 or 11 hours while drinking glasses of mineral water. The first bath session occurred in the morning, the second in the afternoon. This treatment lasted several days until skin pustules formed and broke resulting in the draining of "poisons" considered to be the source of the disease. Then followed another series of shorter, hotter baths to wash the infection away and close the eruptions.

In the English coastal town of Scarborough in 1626, a Mrs. Elizabeth Farrow discovered a stream of acidic water running from one of the cliffs to the south of the town. This was deemed to have beneficial health properties and gave birth to Scarborough Spa. Dr Wittie's book about the spa waters published in 1660 attracted a flood of visitors to the town. Sea bathing was added to the cure, and Scarborough became Britain's first seaside resort. The first rolling bathing machines for bathers are recorded on the sands in 1735.

Bathing in the 18th century
In the 17th century, most upper-class Europeans washed their clothes with water often and washed only their faces (with linen), feeling that bathing the entire body was a lower-class activity; but the upper-class slowly began changing their attitudes toward bathing as a way to restore health later in that century. The wealthy flocked to health resorts to drink and bathe in the waters. In 1702, Anne, Queen of Great Britain, traveled to Bath, the former Roman development, to bathe. A short time later, Richard (Beau) Nash came to Bath. By the force of his personality, Nash became the arbiter of good taste and manners in England. He along with financier Ralph Allen and architect John Wood transformed Bath from a country spa into the social capital of England. Bath set the tone for other spas in Europe to follow. Ostensibly, the wealthy and famous arrived there on a seasonal basis to bathe in and drink the water; however, they also came to display their opulence. Social activities at Bath included dances, concerts, playing cards, lectures, and promenading down the street.

A typical day at Bath might be an early morning communal bath followed by a private breakfast party. Afterwards, one either drank water at the Pump Room (a building constructed over the thermal water source) or attended a fashion show. Physicians encouraged health resort patrons to bathe in and drink the waters with equal vigor. The next several hours of the day could be spent in shopping, visiting the lending library, attending concerts, or stopping at one of the coffeehouses. At 4:00 pm, the rich and famous dressed up in their finery and promenaded down the streets. Next came dinner, more promenading, and an evening of dancing or gambling.

Similar activities occurred in health resorts throughout Europe. The spas became stages on which Europeans paraded with great pageantry. These resorts became infamous as places full of gossip and scandals. The various social and economic classes selected specific seasons during the year's course, staying from one to several months, to vacation at each resort. One season aristocrats occupied the resorts; at other times, prosperous farmers or retired military men took the baths. The wealthy and the criminals that preyed on them moved from one spa to the next as the fashionable season for that resort changed.

During the 18th century, a revival in the medical uses of spring water was promoted by Enlightened physicians across Europe. This revival changed the way of taking a spa treatment. For example, in Karlsbad the accepted method of drinking the mineral water required sending large barrels to individual boardinghouses where the patients drank physician-prescribed dosages in the solitude of their rooms. Dr. David Beecher in 1777 recommended that the patients come to the fountainhead for the water and that each patient should first do some prescribed exercises. This innovation increased the medicinal benefits obtained and gradually physical activity became part of the European bathing regimen. In 1797, in England, Dr. James Currie published The Effects of Water, Cold and Warm, as a Remedy in Fever and other Diseases. As shown by M D Eddy, this book, along with numerous local pamphlets on composition of spa water, stimulated additional interest in water cures and advocated the external and internal use of water as part of the curing process.

Bathing in the 19th and 20th centuries

In the 19th century, bathing became a more accepted practice as physicians realized some of the benefits that cleanliness could provide. A cholera epidemic in Liverpool, England in 1842 resulted in a sanitation renaissance, facilitated by the overlapping hydropathy and sanitation movements, and the implementation of a series of statutes known collectively as "The Baths and Wash-houses Acts 1846 to 1896". The result was increased facilities for bathing and washed clothes, and more people participating in these activities.

In most instances, the formal architectural development of European spas took place in the 18th and 19th centuries. The architecture of Bath, England, developed along Georgian and Neoclassical lines, generally following Palladian structures. The most important architectural form that emerged was the "crescent" — a semi-elliptical street plan used in many areas of England. The spa architecture of Carlsbad, Marienbad, Franzensbad, and Baden-Baden was primarily Neoclassical, but the literature seems to indicate that large bathhouses were not constructed until well into the 19th century. The emphasis on drinking the waters rather than bathing in them led to the development of separate structures known as Trinkhallen (drinking halls) where those taking the cure spent hours drinking water from the springs.

In the Southeastern Europe, development of the spa resorts took place mostly in the second half of the 19th century. So it was also with the Slatina Spa in the Republic of Srpska, BiH, where the thermal and healing springs were discovered in the Roman times. Development of the spa resort in Slatina began in the 1870s, when the first modern spa facilities were built.

By the mid-19th century, the situation had changed dramatically. Visitors to the European spas began to stress bathing in addition to drinking the waters. Besides fountains, pavilions, and Trinkhallen, bathhouses on the scale of the Roman baths were revived. Photographs of a 19th-century spa complex taken in the 1930s, detailing the earlier architecture, show heavy use of mosaic floors, marble walls, classical statuary, arched openings, domed ceilings, segmental arches, triangular pediments, Corinthian columns, and all the other trappings of a Neoclassical revival. The buildings were usually separated by function — with the Trinkhalle, the bathhouse, the inhalatorium (for inhaling the vapors), and the Kurhaus or Conversationhaus that was the center of social activity. Baden-Baden featured golf courses and tennis courts, "superb roads to motor over, and drives along quaint lanes where wild deer are as common as cows to us, and almost as unafraid".

The European spa, then, started with structures to house the drinking function — from simple fountains to pavilions to elaborate Trinkhallen. The enormous bathhouses came later in the 19th century as a renewed preference for an elaborate bathing ritual to cure ills and improve health came into vogue. European architects looked back to Roman civilizations and carefully studied their fine architectural precedents. The Europeans copied the same formality, symmetry, division of rooms by function, and opulent interior design in their bathhouses. They emulated the fountains and formal garden spaces in their resorts, and they also added new diversions. The tour books always mentioned the roomy, woodsy offerings in the vicinity and the faster-paced evening diversions.

By the beginning of the 19th century, the European bathing regimen consisted of numerous accumulated traditions. The bathing routine included soaking in hot water, drinking the water, steaming in a vapor room, and relaxing in a cooling room. In addition, doctors ordered that patients be douched with hot or cold water and given a select diet to promote a cure. Authors began writing guidebooks to the health resorts of Europe explaining the medical benefits and social amenities of each. Rich Europeans and Americans traveled to these resorts to take in cultural activities and the baths.

Each European spa began offering similar cures while maintaining a certain amount of individuality. The 19th-century bathing regimen at Karlsbad can serve as a general portrayal of European bathing practices during this century. Visitors arose at 6 am to drink the water and be serenaded by a band. Next came a light breakfast, bath, and lunch. The doctors at Karlsbad usually limited patients to certain foods for each meal. In the afternoon, visitors went sight-seeing or attended concerts. Nightly theatrical performances followed the evening meal. This ended around 9 pm with the patients returning to their boardinghouses to sleep until 6 the next morning. This regimen continued for as long as a month and then the patients returned home until the next year. Other 19th-century European spa regimens followed similar schedules.

At the beginning of the 20th century, European spas combined a strict diet and exercise regimen with a complex bathing procedure to achieve benefits for the patients. One example will suffice to illustrate the change in bathing procedures. Patients at Baden-Baden, which specialized in treating rheumatoid arthritis, were directed to see a doctor before taking the baths. Once this occurred, the bathers proceeded to the main bathhouse where they paid for their baths and stored their valuables before being assigned a booth for undressing. The bathhouse supplied bathers with towels, sheets, and slippers.

The Baden-Baden bathing procedure began with a warm shower. The bathers next entered a room of circulating,  hot air for 20 minutes, spent another ten minutes in a room with  temperature, partook of a  vapor bath, then showered and received a soap massage. After the massage, the bathers swam in a pool heated approximately to body temperature. After the swim, the bathers rested for 15 to 20 minutes in the warm "Sprudel" room pool . This shallow pool's bottom contained an  layer of sand through with naturally carbonated water bubbled up. This was followed by a series of gradually cooler showers and pools. After that, the attendants rubbed down the bathers with warm towels and then wrapped them in sheets and covered them with blankets to rest for 20 minutes. This ended the bathing portion of the treatment. The rest of the cure consisted of a prescribed diet, exercise, and water-drinking program.

The European spas provided various other diversions for guests after the bath, including gambling, horse racing, fishing, hunting, tennis, skating, dancing, golf, and horseback riding. Sight-seeing and theatrical performances served as further incentives for people to go to the spa. Some European governments even recognized the medical benefits of spa therapy and paid a portion of the patient's expenses. A number of these spas catered to those suffering from obesity and overindulgence in addition to various other medical complaints. In recent years, the elegance and style of earlier centuries may have diminished, but people still come to the natural hot springs for relaxation and health. In Germany, the tradition survives to the present day. 'Taking a cure' (Kur) at a spa is generally covered to a large amount by both public and private health care insurance. Usually, a doctor prescribes a stay of three weeks at a mineral spring or other natural setting where a patient's condition will be treated with healing spring waters and natural therapies. While the insurance companies used to also cover meals and accommodation, many now only pay for the treatments and expect the patient to pay for transportation, accommodation, and meals. Most Germans are eligible for a Kur every two to six years, depending on the severity of their condition. Germans do still get paid their regular salary during this time away from their job, which is not taken out of their vacation days.

In colonial America

Some European colonists brought with them knowledge of the hot water therapy for medicinal purposes, and others learned the benefits of hot springs from the Native Americans. Europeans gradually obtained many of the hot and cold springs from the various Indian tribes. They then developed the spring to suit European tastes. By the 1760s, British colonists were traveling to hot and cold springs in Connecticut, Pennsylvania, New York, and Virginia in search of water cures. Among the more frequently visited of these springs were Bath, Yellow, and Bristol Springs in Pennsylvania; and Warm Springs, Hot Springs, and White Sulphur Springs (now in West Virginia) in Virginia. In the last decade of the 1700s, New York spas were beginning to be frequented by intrepid travelers, most notably Ballston Spa. Nearby Saratoga Springs and Kinderhook were yet to be discovered.

Colonial doctors gradually began to recommend hot springs for ailments. Dr. Benjamin Rush, American patriot and physician, praised the springs of Bristol, Pennsylvania, in 1773. Dr. Samuel Tenney in 1783 and Dr. Valentine Seaman in 1792 examined the water of Ballston Spa in New York and wrote of possible medicinal uses of the springs. Hotels were constructed to accommodate visitors to the various springs. Entrepreneurs operated establishments where the travelers could lodge, eat, and drink. Thus began the health resort industry in the United States.

Bathing in 19th- and 20th-century America

After the American Revolution, the spa industry continued to gain popularity. The first truly popular spa was Saratoga Springs, which, by 1815, had two large, four-story, Greek revival hotels. It grew rapidly, and by 1821 it had at least five hundred rooms for accommodation. Its relative proximity to New York City and access to the country's most developed steamboat lines meant that by the mid-1820s the spa became the country's most popular tourist destination, serving both the country's elite and a more middle-class audience. Although spa activity had been central to Saratoga in the 1810s, by the 1820s the resort had hotels with great ballrooms, opera houses, stores, and clubhouses. The Union Hotel (first built in 1803 but steadily expanded over the coming decades) had its own esplanade, and by the 1820s had its own fountain and formal landscaping, but with only two small bathhouses.

As the resort developed as a tourist destination mineral bathhouses became auxiliary structures and not the central features of the resort, although the drinking of mineral water was at least followed as a pro-forma activity by most in attendance, despite nightly dinners that were elaborate and extensive. Although the ostensible purpose of the Saratoga and other New York spas was to provide access to the healthful mineral waters, their real drawing card was a complex social life and a cultural cachet. However, the wider audience it garnered by the late 1820s began to take some of the bloom off the resort, and in the mid-1830s, as a successful bid to revive itself, it turned to horse racing.

By the mid-1850s hot and cold spring resorts existed in 20 states. Many of these resorts contained similar architectural features. Most health resorts had a large, two-story central building near or at the springs, with smaller structures surrounding it. The main building provided the guests with facilities for dining, and possibly, dancing on the first floor, and the second story consisted of sleeping rooms. The outlying structures were individual guest cabins, and other auxiliary buildings formed a semicircle or U-shape around the large building.

These resorts offered swimming, fishing, hunting, and horseback riding as well as facilities for bathing. The Virginia resorts, particularly White Sulphur Springs, proved popular before and after the Civil War. After the Civil War, spa vacations became very popular as returning soldiers bathed to heal wounds and the American economy allowed more leisure time. Saratoga Springs in New York became one of the main centers for this type of activity. Bathing in and drinking the warm, carbonated spring water only served as a prelude to the more interesting social activities of gambling, promenading, horse racing, and dancing.

During the last half of the 19th century, western entrepreneurs developed natural hot and cold springs into resorts — from the Mississippi River to the West Coast. Many of these spas offered individual tub baths, vapor baths, douche sprays, needle showers, and pool bathing to their guests. The various railroads that spanned the country promoted these resorts to encourage train travel. Hot Springs, Arkansas, became a major resort for people from the large metropolitan areas of St. Louis and Chicago.

The popularity of the spas continued into the 20th century. Some medical critics, however, charged that the thermal waters in such renowned resorts as Hot Springs, Virginia, and Saratoga Springs, New York, were no more beneficial to health than ordinary heated water. The various spa owners countered these arguments by developing better hydrotherapy for their patients. At the Saratoga spa, treatments for heart and circulatory disorders, rheumatic conditions, nervous disorders, metabolic diseases, and skin diseases were developed. In 1910, the New York state government began purchasing the principal springs to protect them from exploitation.

When Franklin Delano Roosevelt was governor of New York, he pushed for a European type of spa development at Saratoga. The architects for the new complex spent two years studying the technical aspects of bathing in Europe. Completed in 1933, the development had three bathhouses — Lincoln, Washington, and Roosevelt — a drinking hall, the Hall of Springs, and a building housing the Simon Baruch Research Institute. Four additional buildings composed the recreation area and housed arcades and a swimming pool decorated with blue faience terra-cotta tile. Saratoga Spa State Park's Neoclassical buildings were laid out in a grand manner, with formal perpendicular axes, solid brick construction, and stone and concrete Roman-revival detailing.

The spa was surrounded by a  natural park that had  of bridle paths, "with measured walks at scientifically calculated gradients through its groves and vales, with spouting springs adding unexpected touches to its vistas, with the tumbling waters of Geyser Brook flowing beneath bridges of the fine roads.  Full advantage has been taken of the natural beauty of the park, but no formal landscaping". Promotional literature again advertised the attractions directly outside the spa: shopping, horse races, and historic sites associated with revolutionary war history. New York Governor Herbert Lehman opened the new facilities to the public in July 1935.

Other leading spas in the U.S. during this period were French Lick, Indiana; Hot Springs and White Sulphur Springs, West Virginia; Hot Springs, Arkansas; and Warm Springs, Georgia. French Lick specialized in treating obesity and constipation through a combination of bathing and drinking the water and exercising. Hot Springs, Virginia, specialized in digestive ailments and heart diseases, and White Sulphur Springs, Virginia, treated these ailments and skin diseases. Both resorts offered baths where the water would wash continuously over the patients as they lay in a shallow pool. Warm Springs, Georgia, gained a reputation for treating infantile paralysis by a procedure of baths and exercise. President Franklin D. Roosevelt, who earlier supported Saratoga, became a frequent visitor and promoter of this spa.

Treatments
A 'body treatment', 'spa treatment', or 'cosmetic treatment' is non-medical procedure to help the health of the body. It is often performed at a resort, destination spa, day spa, beauty salon or school.

Typical treatments include:
 Aromatherapy
 Ayurveda
 Bathing or soaking in any of the following:
 Artificial waterfall, as cervical (spine) waterfall.
 Feetbath
 Hot spring
 Onsen (Japanese Hot Springs)
 Thermae (Roman Hot Springs)
 Hot tub
 Mud bath
 Jet hydro massage, as swan-neck jet hydro massage
 Peat pulp bath
 Sauna
 Steam bath
 Vichy shower
 Body wraps, wrapping the body in hot linens, plastic sheets and blankets, or mud wraps, often in combination with herbal compounds.
 Massage
 Hair care
 Nail care such as manicures and pedicures
 Electrolysis
 Waxing, the removal of body hair with hot wax
Facial

Recent trends
By the late 1930s more than 2,000 hot- or cold-springs health resorts were operating in the United States. This number had diminished greatly by the 1950s and continued to decline in the following two decades. In the recent past, spas in the U.S. emphasized dietary, exercise, or recreational programs more than traditional bathing activities.

Up until recently, the public bathing industry in the U.S. remained stagnant. Nevertheless, in Europe, therapeutic baths have always been very popular, and remain so today. The same is true in Japan, where the traditional hot springs baths, known as onsen, always attracted plenty of visitors.

But also in the U.S., with the increasing focus on health and wellness, such treatments are again becoming popular.

Types of treatments
 Day spa, a form of beauty salon.
 Destination spa, a resort for personal care treatments.
 Spa town, a town visited for the supposed healing properties of the water.
 Foot spa
 Head spa
 Steam Rooms
 Sauna services
 Hot tub, in United States usage.
 Spa (mineral water), from the sources in Spa.
 Ganban'yoku, a hot stone spa
 Spas usually offer mud baths for general health, or to address a variety of medical conditions. This is also known as 'fangotherapy'. A variety of medicinal clays and peats is used.

International Spa Association definitions
Spa - places devoted to overall well-being through a variety of professional services that encourage the renewal of mind, body and spirit.

Types
 Ayurvedic spa, in which treatments are inspired by traditional Indian medical practices.
 Club spa, a facility whose primary purpose is fitness or pool and which offers a variety of professionally administered spa services on a day-use basis.
 Cruise ship spa, a spa aboard a cruise ship providing professionally administered spa services, fitness and wellness components and spa cuisine menu choices.
 Day spa, a spa offering a variety of professionally administered spa services to clients on a day-use basis.
 Dental spa, a facility under the supervision of a licensed dentist that combines traditional dental treatment with the services of a spa.
 Destination spa, a facility with the primary purpose of guiding individual spa-goers to develop healthy habits. Historically a seven-day stay, this lifestyle transformation can be accomplished by providing a comprehensive program that includes spa services, physical fitness activities, wellness education, healthful cuisine and special interest programming.
 Hot tub, an outdoor spa used for bathing and self cleansing
 Medical spa, a facility that operates under the full-time, on-site supervision of a licensed health care professional whose primary purpose is to provide comprehensive medical and wellness care in an environment that integrates spa services, as well as traditional, complementary and/or alternative therapies and treatments. The facility operates within the scope of practice of its staff, which can include both aesthetic/cosmetic and prevention/wellness procedures and services. These spas typically use balneotherapy, employing a variety of peloids."Balneotherapy treatments can have different purposes. In a spa setting, they can be used to treat conditions such as arthritis and backache, build up muscles after injury or illness or to stimulate the immune system, and they can be enjoyed as a relief from day-to-day stress."
 Mineral springs spa, a spa offering an on-site source of natural mineral, thermal or seawater used in hydrotherapy treatments.
 Resort/hotel spa, a spa owned by and located within a resort or hotel providing professionally administered spa services, fitness and wellness components and spa cuisine menu choices.
 Mobile spa, a spa which provides services at home, hotels, or wherever you are.

Regulation of the industry
The International Spa and Body Wrap Association (ISBWA) is an international association for spas and body wrap centers around the world. The main concern of the ISBWA is the regulation of the industry and the welfare of the consumers. Member organisations are to adhere to the ISBWA code of ethics, which requires them to do the following:
 Provide treatments and products that are safe, sanitary, and effective.
 Adhere to the highest standards of professionalism and honesty in all client interactions, and will not engage in any unethical practices.
 Respect the right of its clients to dignity, confidentiality, and privacy.
 Make a commitment to improving its services and treatments.
 Adhere to the laws, rules and regulations governing the provision of treatments and services as required by their local government in which they operate.

The Uniform Swimming Pool, Spa and Hot Tub Code (USPSHTC) is a model code developed by the International Association of Plumbing and Mechanical Officials (IAPMO) to govern the installation and inspection of plumbing systems associated with swimming pools, spas and hot tubs as a means of promoting the public's health, safety and welfare.

Gallery

See also

 Jacuzzi
 List of spa towns
 Massage
 Peloids
 Sauna
 Spa, Belgium, a municipality of Belgium
 Uniform Swimming Pool, Spa and Hot Tub Code
 Water cure (therapy)

Notes

Bibliography
 Nathaniel Altman, Healing springs: the ultimate guide to taking the waters : from hidden springs to the world's greatest spas. Inner Traditions / Bear & Company, 2000. 
 Dian Dincin Buchman, The complete book of water healing. 2nd ed., McGraw-Hill Professional, 2001. 
 Jane Crebbin-Bailey, John W. Harcup, John Harrington, The Spa Book: The Official Guide to Spa Therapy. Publisher: Cengage Learning EMEA, 2005. 
 Esti Dvorjetski, Leisure, pleasure, and healing: spa culture and medicine in ancient eastern Mediterranean., Brill, 2007 (illustrated). 
 Carola Koenig, Specialized Hydro-, Balneo-and Medicinal Bath Therapy. Publisher: iUniverse, 2005. 
 Anne Williams, Spa bodywork: a guide for massage therapists. Lippincott Williams & Wilkins, 2006. 
 Richard Gassan, The Birth of American Tourism: New York, the Hudson Valley, and American Culture, 1790-1830. University of Massachusetts Press, 2008. 
 Thomas Chambers, Drinking the Waters: Creating an American Leisure Class at Nineteenth-Century Mineral Springs. Smithsonian Institution Press, 2002. (Out of print)
 Charlene Boyer Lewis, Ladies and Gentlemen on Display: Planter Society at the Virginia Springs, 1790-1860. University of Virginia Press, 2001.

External links

International Spa Association Official website

 
Therapy
Balneotherapy
Bathing